is a clothing company headquartered in Kobe, Japan.  It was founded in 1959 and in 2005 initiated a management buyout, making it a privately held company.

World Co. produces no clothing under its own name, but instead owns a number of brands under which it markets its clothing.

External links
 World Co., Ltd. official website

References

Privately held companies of Japan
Companies formerly listed on the Tokyo Stock Exchange

Companies based in Kobe
1959 establishments in Japan